I. Nelson Rose  (born May 23, 1950) is an internationally known author and public speaker, and is recognized as one of the world's leading experts on gambling and gaming law. He is currently a Professor Emeritus at Whittier College and a Visiting Professor at the University of Macau. Rose is best known for his internationally syndicated column and 1986 book, Gambling and the Law.

Impact on legal gambling
In 1979, while still a student at Harvard Law School, Rose developed the theory of the Third Wave of Legal Gambling.  Examining the dates when laws had been enacted in the past, he concluded that legal gambling had twice before swept the nation.  He correctly predicted that state lotteries, casinos and other forms of gambling would once again be made legal in the United States.  According to the theory, legal gambling will continue to spread, until it is once again outlawed. .

The Third Wave of Legal Gambling theory inspired both entrepreneurs and governments to expand legal gaming, in part because it showed how much money could be made by the initial operators.  "Suppose Prohibition of alcohol had just been repealed. The hypothetical owner of the first and only liquor store in a state would make a fantastic return on investment."

The Third Wave of Legal Gambling theory explains why the states differ so much in their approaches to gaming. Rose showed the legal problems created by prohibitions in state constitutions dating from the 19th century on lotteries.  For example, in 1990, the Mississippi Supreme Court discussed Rose's Third Wave of Legal Gambling theory in oral argument, concluding that that state's ancient constitutional ban on "lotteries" did not prevent the Mississippi Legislature from legalizing charity bingo.  The next year the Legislature authorized casinos, making Mississippi the third leading casino state, after Nevada and New Jersey.

Rose has also been involved in other major developments involving legal gambling in the U.S. and abroad.  He has worked with governments and industry in legalizing and regulating casinos, poker, bingo and lotteries. . He also was instrumental in the introduction of contests of skill and subscription and other games with free alternative means of entry. He wrote the legal opinion for PurePlay.com, the world's largest no-purchase-necessary poker site.

Rose's testimony led to the introduction of Texas hold 'em and Pai Gow Poker into California cardrooms in the 1980s;  His work with tribes and suppliers on the Indian Gaming Regulatory Act and in testifying on what is legal on Indian land helped lead to the creation of the modern tribal bingo hall and casino.

In 1999, the California Supreme Court cited Gambling and the Law in striking down Proposition 5, which had won the most expensive initiative campaign battle in the nation's history, and which would have legalized tribal casinos as "lotteries." In 2006, the first NAFTA tribunal involving gaming adopted Rose's testimony, on behalf of the federal government of Mexico, on what constituted a slot machine as opposed to a game of skill. The North Dakota Supreme Court also adopted his position on what is a slot machine.   The California Supreme Court adopted his testimony on what constituted a banking game, closing down the State lottery's Keno.

In "Compulsive Gambling and the Law",  Rose described how the views of society, and thus of the law, toward problem gambling are changing.  In his writings and public presentations, he explained how courts and lawmakers were struggling with the concept that a person might bet too much because they were ill, rather than because they were morally weak.   He incorporated the California Counsel on Problem Gambling, wrote the bill providing funding for the Texas Counsel on Problem Gambling.  In 1990, he argued the case of Erickson v. Desert Palace, Inc., before the Ninth Circuit, on behalf of a 19-year-old boy who was denied a million-dollar slot machine jackpot by Caesars Palace, and asked the U.S. Supreme Court to hear the appeal. Rose was instrumental in getting governments and operators to put in place protections for compulsive and underage gamblers.

Rose is the co-author of "Internet Gaming Law" (1st  and 2nd  editions), Blackjack and the Law, and the first casebook on the subject, "Gaming Law: Cases and Materials".  He was instrumental in having gaming law recognized as a legitimate field of study, and co-authored Gaming Law in a Nutshell in 2012, and the second edition in 2017. Rose was co-editor-in-chief of the Gaming Law Review & Economics for more than 12 years and is now editor emeritus.  He is a consultant to governments and industry and has testified as an expert witness on gaming in administrative, civil and criminal cases, and international arbitrations.

Education and legal practice
Rose graduated from UCLA with a B.A. in 1973 and with a J.D. in 1979 from Harvard Law School.  Immediately following graduation from Harvard, Rose moved to Hawaii to practice law.  He passed the Hawaii and California bars and has also been admitted to practice in federal courts, including Ninth Circuit Court of Appeals and the United States Supreme Court.

While in Hawaii, Rose established the state's first eye bank, the Hawai'i Lions Eye Bank & Makana Foundation, in 1981.  He helped get state law changed to allow donor stickers on drivers' licenses and permit trained nurses to harvest tissue. Rose served as legal counsel to the eye bank from 1981-1983. .

Teaching
Rose joined what was then named Whittier College School of Law in 1973 as a Visiting Assistant Professor.  Over the years, he was promoted to Full Professor with tenure.  In Fall 1983, Rose developed and taught the first law school class on Gaming Law.   Today there are at least 31 law schools with courses in Gaming Law, as well as graduate business schools and undergraduate colleges, many using the casebook Rose co-authored.

In 1993-1994, Rose became the first Visiting Scholar for the University of Nevada-Reno's Institute for the Study of Gambling and Commercial Gaming.  His Gaming Law classes were open to undergraduates, graduate students, and practicing lawyers and regulators.  At that time, Nevada had no law school, so Rose was the only person teaching Gaming Law in the nation's leading state for legal gaming.

In 2004, Rose taught a seminar on International Gaming Law for Whittier Law School's Summer Abroad program in China.  He taught the same class the following years in Spain and France.  He also taught classes on gaming law to the FBI; at colleges in Slovenia; and, at UNR's professional training courses in Reno, Tahoe and Macau.

Rose began co-teaching, with Professor Jorge Godinho, a graduate level class in Gaming Law at the Masters and Postgraduate Programs in International Business Law at the University of Macau in 2007.  Most of the students have law degrees from China, Macau or countries in the Portuguese-speaking world, such as Angola and East Timor. Rose has taught the course every summer, in May or June, since 2007.  He has also participated as the lead judge for students defending their Masters' theses on issues related to legal gambling.

Consultant and expert witness
Rose has testified as an expert witness in administrative, civil and criminal cases, and international arbitrations throughout the United States, in Australia, Canada, France, New Zealand, and the United Kingdom, including the first NAFTA tribunal on gaming issues.  He has acted as a consultant to major law firms, international corporations, licensed casinos, Indian tribes, and local, state and national governments, including the states of Arizona, California, Delaware, Florida, Illinois, Michigan, New Jersey, New Mexico, Texas; the District of Columbia; the provinces of Ontario and Québec; the Lao People's Democratic Republic; and the federal governments of Canada, Mexico and the United States. 

Rose's clients include regulators, such as the Arizona Department of Gaming, the Delaware State Lottery (regulates sports books and racinos), the Illinois Gaming Board, the Texas Comptroller (regulated bingo) and the New Jersey Division of Gaming Enforcement.  He has also worked with the largest operators, including Nevada and Atlantic City casinos, California cardrooms, state and national lotteries, race tracks, Indian tribes and online gambling operators. 

Rose has testified as an expert on legal gambling before the California Legislature, Hawaii House of Representatives' Finance Committee, New Mexico Legislature and Oregon Governor's Task Force on Gaming. He has worked with the Florida State Senate on Indian gambling, the Florida Department of Business & Professional Regulation's Division of Pari-Mutuel Wagering on poker rooms, and the Washington State Gambling Commission on casinos. 

Rose has testified as an expert in cases involving casino gambling; lotteries, including keno and the New York and California State Lotteries; bingo, including mechanical devices in Texas and California; Indian gambling; skill versus chance; the meaning of gambling terms and the legality of proposed games. He has been cited in numerous published court decisions, including quoted by the Supreme Courts of North Dakota and California.

Public speaking
With the rising interest in gambling throughout the world, Rose has addressed such diverse groups as the National Conference of State Legislatures, Congress of State Lotteries of Europe and the National Academy of Sciences.  He has presented scholarly papers on gambling in Nevada, New Jersey, Puerto Rico, Canada, England, Australia, Antigua, Portugal, Italy, Argentina, Norway, and the Czech Republic.

Publications
Rose began writing his internationally syndicated column, "Gambling and the Law", in 1983 for Gambling Times magazine.  He later self-syndicated the column to other publications, both on and off the Internet, directed at laymen and professionals interested in the legal gambling industries. In 1991, he was granted the federal trademark on "Gambling and the Law"  "For: syndicated and featured articles appearing in a variety of magazines and newspapers; and books, on the topic of gambling."

"Gambling and the Law" columns appear in approximately 100 magazines, newspapers and journals, including Inside Asian Gaming, Casino Enterprise Management, Poker Player, Harvard Medical School's The Brief Addiction Science Information Source (BASIS), iGaming Business, Casino City Times, Bingo Bugles, CasinoCompendium.com, The GameMaster Online, American Casino Guide and Gaming Law Review. 

His main writing is now a weekly blog at www.GamblingAndTheLaw.com.

Rose also writes for scholarly journals and books, usually using his trademark "Gambling and the Law". Articles include: "Game on for Internet Gambling," with Rebecca Bolin in the Connecticut Law Review; "The DOJ Gives States a Gift," in the UNLV Gaming Law Journal; "The Third Wave of Legal Gambling," in the Villanova Sports & Entertainment Law Journal"; "Leading Law Cases on Gambling," in William N. Thompson, "The International Encyclopedia of Gambling" (ABC-Clio 2010); "Internet Gambling and the Law," in the Richmond Journal of Global Law and Business; "The International Law of Remote Wagering," in the John Marshall Law Review; and "The Explosive But Sporadic Growth of Gambling in Asia," in the Harvard Asia Pacific Review. 

Some of his writings include: "Of Course It's a Depression", "Casinos on Cruse Ships, Why Not on Airplanes?", "The New UIGEA Regulations: Opportunities for Operators", "Betting on Beanie Babies", "The Rise and Fall of the Third Wave: Gambling Will Be Outlawed in Forty Years", "Compulsive Gambling and the Law",  and "Prohibition 2.0: The Unlawful Internet Gambling Act of 2006 Analyzed".  His columns and articles are often discussed in the news media, even in non-English language outlets. For example, "Cuba Will Have Casinos, Again" caused a stir in Latin America.

References

External links
 Official site

Living people
1950 births
American gambling writers
Harvard Law School alumni
University of California, Los Angeles alumni